Firuzabad (also Romanized as Fīrūzābād; also known as Pīrūzābād) is a village in Sabzdasht Rural District, in the Central District of Bafq County, Yazd Province, Iran. At the 2006 census, its population was 15, in 6 families.

References 

Populated places in Bafq County